Rise Up is the eighth studio album by Cypress Hill, which was released on April 20, 2010. It is their first album of new material in six years, following 2004's Till Death Do Us Part, and their first to be released on EMI's Priority Records, their first venture away from Columbia, who handled all of their previous releases.

Background
There was a gap of six years between Till Death Do Us Part and Rise Up, the longest between studio albums of Cypress Hill's recording career at the time of release. The group commenced work on the record in 2005, but had not entered studio work until 2008. The writing and recording process spanned four years and a number of recording studios and was finished in 2009.

Rise Up was delayed several times before its release. Originally scheduled to be released in 2006, it was later postponed to March 23, 2010 (exactly six years since the release of their last album), then again to April 6. The album's release date was finally set for April 20, 2010.

In terms of the album's musical direction, in March 2010 Cypress Hill emcee B-Real told noted UK urban writer Pete Lewis - Deputy Editor of the award-winning Blues & Soul - "Musically we wanted a bigger sound, a more AGGRESSIVE sound, and something obviously with a lotta DYNAMICS. You know, our sound has always been raw and gritty, ominous and moody... And, while this time we still wanted it to be raw and dark, we also wanted it to be more UPTEMPO. Because, in terms of the live setting, whenever we do songs that are more uptempo and aggressive people do love them and it makes for a great SHOW. So, while making this album, we definitely had the intention of making songs that would translate well to the live aspect of what Cypress Hill is about. So that, when we play these songs out, we're gonna get a magnificent reaction from the crowd!"

Production
Rise Up marks a major shift in the group's sound, as it was the first of their albums not produced by founding member DJ Muggs. While Muggs does contribute co-production with DJ Khalil on two songs, B-Real takes on the role as main producer, executive producer and overseer of the project. Other producers include Mike Shinoda of Linkin Park, Jim Jonsin, Pete Rock, Jake One, Sick Jacken and Tom Morello.

Featured guests include Daron Malakian of System of a Down,  Pitbull, Everlast, Evidence, Young De, Tom Morello of Rage Against the Machine and Audioslave, and Marc Anthony. Other artists like Ill Bill, Apathy, DJ Premier and Slash were also featured as guests but never made the final cut.

Reception

The album's introduction single, "It Ain't Nothin'" was released as a free download from the group's official website with a music video by Matt Alonzo. "Rise Up", with Tom Morello, is the second single; it also features as the theme song for Elimination Chamber 2010 and the end-credit track for the Season 3 finale episode of the television show Silicon Valley.

PopMatters said, "As much as B-Real still seems lively, Sen Dog seems to have smoked himself out of being a rapper. He sounds exhausted and unimaginative all over this record. He doesn’t even appear on all of the tracks. This imbalance, coupled with the array of random producers, causes an inconsistency in the LP’s sound that hurts Rise Up."

An early review, Scottish magazine The Skinny offered a largely positive 3 stars (out of 5), noting that the album appears "less playful than its predecessor (2004’s Clash-sampling Till Death Do Us Part) but surprisingly more focused - given Muggs’ notable absence from the producer's chair – [The Hill] source inspired collaborations with Pete Rock, Jim Jonsin and Marc Anthony to reinforce their timeless agenda."

Commercial
Rise Up debuted on the Billboard 200 on April 28 at #19 selling 18,000 copies. The next week it fell over 50 spots to #72 on the Top 200 albums. In its third week the album fell off the Top 100 to #105 and has sold 31,000 copies to date.

Track listing

Sample credits
 "It Ain't Nothin'" contains elements of "I'm So Into You", written and performed by Peabo Bryson.
 "Light It Up" contains a sample of "Standing in the Shadows of Love", written by Holland–Dozier–Holland, as performed by Barry White.
 "Bang Bang" contains samples from "Bang Bang", written by Sonny Bono, as performed by Vanilla Fudge.
 "Get 'Em Up" contains a sample from "Welcome to the Terrordome", written by Chuck D and Keith Shocklee, and performed by Public Enemy.
 "Take My Pain" contains elements of "Break On Through", written by John Densmore, Robby Krieger, Ray Manzarek, and Jim Morrison.
 "I Unlimited" contains a sample from "Buffalo Gals", written by Malcolm McLaren, Trevor Horn, and Anne Dudley, and performed by Malcolm McLaren.
 "Armed & Dangerous" contains a sample from "I Didn't Realize the Show Was Over", written by Willie Hutch, and performed by The Miracles.
 "Armada Latina" contains samples from "Suite: Judy Blue Eyes", written by Stephen Stills, and performed by Crosby, Stills & Nash.

Personnel

 Louis Freese – vocals, producer
 Senen Reyes – vocals
 Lawrence Muggerud – executive producer
 Mason Escalante - vocals, producer
 Eric Correa – drums
 Khalil Abdul-Rahman – producer
 Marc Anthony – guest vocals
 David Benveniste – artists and repertoire
 Leota Blacknor – marketing
 Jacob Dutton – producer
 Nicole Frantz – creative director
 Brian Gardner – mastering
 Julio González – scratching
 Joaquin González – producer
 Frank Maddocks – art direction, design, photography
 Daron Malakian – producer, guitar
 Alan Maman – guest vocals

 Deborah Mannis-Gardner – sample clearance
 Malcolm McLaren – additional producer
 James Minchin III – photography, band photo
 Tom Morello – producer, guitars, bass
 Armando Pérez – guest vocals
 Michael Perretta – guest vocals
 Peter Phillips – producer
 Frank Romano – guitars, bass
 James Scheffer – producer
 Erik Schrody – guest vocals
 Bob Semanovich – marketing
 Demerick Shelton – guest vocals
 Mike Shinoda – guest vocals, producer
 Rob Stevenson – artists and repertoire
 Jay Turner – scratching, programming

Charts

Weekly charts

Year-end charts

Release history

References

External links
Cypress Hill, "Rise Up" by Billboard

2010 albums
Cypress Hill albums
Priority Records albums
EMI Records albums
Albums produced by DJ Khalil
Albums produced by DJ Muggs
Albums produced by Jake One
Albums produced by Jim Jonsin
Albums produced by Pete Rock
Albums produced by Mike Shinoda